Podunk is a term used in the United States to represent an insignificant place. 

Podunk may also refer to:

 Podunk people, an Algonquian-language, Eastern Woodlands group of Native Americans

Places in the United States
 Podunk, New York, a hamlet
 Denver Harbor, Houston, nicknamed Podunk, an area of Houston, Texas
 Poeville, Nevada, nicknamed Podunk, a ghost town
 Podunk, an area near East Brookfield, Massachusetts
 Podunk River, a stream in Hartford County, Connecticut

Arts and entertainment
 Podunk (band), a Texas rock band
 "Podunk" (song), by Keith Anderson, 2006
 "Podunk", a song by Foo Fighters, a B-side of the single "This Is a Call"
 Podunk Bluegrass Festival, an annual bluegrass festival in East Hartford, Connecticut, US
 Podunk, a fictional town in the video game Secret of Evermore
 Podunk, a fictional town in the 2015 localisation of the 1989 Japanese video game Mother